Low Wee Wern (born 25 July 1990 in Penang, Malaysia) is a Malaysian professional squash player. She reached a career-high world ranking of World No. 5 in October 2014.

Personal life
Low attended Methodist Girls' School, Penang for her primary school years before moving to Sri Pelita for her secondary school years. She also has a sister Low Wee Nee who was a professional squash player.

Career 
Low began playing squash at the age of nine based at the Penang International Squash Centre in Bukit Dumbar, Penang. Between 2001 to 2006, Low won 19 Junior titles including U19 Asian Junior and Pioneer Cup titles in 2006.

In 2010, she was part of the Malaysian team that won the bronze medal at the 2010 Women's World Team Squash Championships. Two years later, she was again part of the Malaysian team that won the bronze medal at the 2012 Women's World Team Squash Championships.

In 2014 Incheon Asian Games, Low took the women's singles silver medal after losing to her compatriot Nicol David. She also won the gold medal for women's team alongside David and her teammates. Also in 2014, she was part of the Malaysian team that won the silver medal at the 2014 Women's World Team Squash Championships; she had previously won two bronze medals. She also reached a career high of world number 5.

In 2019, she won her third Malaysian national title. After suffering several knee injuries she returned to the tour in September 2022.

References

External links 

1990 births
Living people
Malaysian female squash players
People from Penang
Sportspeople from Penang
Malaysian people of Chinese descent
Commonwealth Games competitors for Malaysia
Squash players at the 2010 Commonwealth Games
Squash players at the 2014 Commonwealth Games
Asian Games medalists in squash
Asian Games gold medalists for Malaysia
Asian Games silver medalists for Malaysia
Asian Games bronze medalists for Malaysia
Squash players at the 2010 Asian Games
Squash players at the 2014 Asian Games
Squash players at the 2018 Asian Games
Medalists at the 2010 Asian Games
Medalists at the 2014 Asian Games
Medalists at the 2018 Asian Games
Competitors at the 2013 World Games
21st-century Malaysian women